Ceratina dallatorreana is a species of small carpenter bee in the family Apidae. It is found in Africa, Europe and Northern Asia (excluding China), and North America.

References

Further reading

 

dallatorreana
Articles created by Qbugbot
Insects described in 1896